The U.S. Women's Amateur is the leading golf tournament in the United States for female amateur golfers. It is played annually and is one of the 13 United States national golf championships organized by the United States Golf Association (USGA). Female amateurs from all nations are eligible to compete and there are no age restrictions. It was established in 1895, one month after the men's U.S. Amateur and U.S. Open.  It is the third oldest USGA championship, over a half century older than the U.S. Women's Open, which was first played in 1946.  Along with the British Ladies Amateur, the U.S. Women's Amateur is considered the highest honor in women's amateur golf.

Robert Cox Cup
Since 1896 the Robert Cox Cup has been awarded annually by the USGA to the winner. The trophy was donated by Robert Cox of Edinburgh, Scotland, a member of the British Parliament and a golf course designer. It remains the oldest surviving trophy awarded for a USGA championship. Along with a gold medal, a replica of the  silver case of Etruscan design is given to the tournament winner. The original trophy is on permanent display at the USGA Museum and Library. The Robert Cox Cup is the only USGA trophy donated by someone from another country.

The first tournament attracted a field of 13 and was played over 18 holes. As in the case of the men's U.S. Amateur, entry was originally restricted to members of USGA-affiliated private clubs (and, presumably, international players who were members of clubs affiliated with their nations' golf governing bodies); this policy remained in place until the 1979 tournament. Several thousand women now enter the event, and the USGA conducts sectional qualifying to reduce the number of contestants to a more manageable number. The main tournament opens with two rounds of stroke play. The leading 64 players then compete in a match play competition. The matches are played over 18 holes except for the final, which is played over 36 holes.

In 1956, Ann Gregory became the first African American to compete in the Championship, held that year at the Meridian Hills Country Club in Indianapolis. 

There are no age restrictions on entry. Players must have a handicap index of 5.4 or less. Morgan Pressel qualified as a 13-year-old in 2001 and won in 2005 at the age of 17. The 2006 winner Kimberly Kim was only 14 years old, breaking the record previously held by Laura Baugh.  In 2007, Pearl Jin and Alexis Thompson became the first 12-year-olds to qualify and the first to advance to match play. Jin and Thompson faced one another in the third round match play. Thompson beat Jin, but then lost in the quarterfinals. 

Because the tournament is dominated by teenagers and college-age players who are working toward careers as tournament professionals, the USGA introduced a separate tournament in 1987 for players age 25 and over, called the U.S. Women's Mid-Amateur. It gives older amateur players an opportunity to compete among themselves for a national title; entrants must have a handicap index of 9.4 or less. 

The USGA rates Glenna Collett Vare as the most noteworthy champion who won the Robert Cox Cup a record six times. Several U.S. Women's Amateur champions who have gone on to become leading professionals including Patty Berg, Babe Zaharias, Louise Suggs and Beth Daniel.

The two finalists win exemptions to the ensuing U.S. Women's Open, and the winner also wins exemptions to The Women's Open Championship and upon turning 50, the U.S. Senior Women's Open (one year exemption for players who eventually turned professional, and five years for players who did not turn professional).

Winners

Multiple winners
Nineteen players have won more than one U.S. Women's Amateur, through 2021:
 6 wins: Glenna Collett-Vare
 5 wins: JoAnne Gunderson Carner
 3 wins: Beatrix Hoyt, Margaret Curtis, Dorothy Campbell, Alexa Stirling, Virginia Van Wie, Anne Quast, Juli Inkster
 2 wins: Genevieve Hecker, Katherine Harley, Betty Jameson, Barbara McIntire, Beth Daniel, Kay Cockerill, Vicki Goetze, Kelli Kuehne, Danielle Kang, Kristen Gillman

Seven players have won both the U.S. Women's Amateur and Open Championships, through 2021:
 Patty Berg: 1938 Amateur; 1946 Open
 Betty Jameson: 1939, 1940 Amateurs; 1947 Open
 Babe Zaharias: 1946 Amateur; 1948, 1950, 1954 Opens
 Louise Suggs: 1947 Amateur; 1949, 1952 Opens
 Catherine Lacoste: 1969 Amateur; 1967 Open
 JoAnne Gunderson Carner: 1957, 1960, 1962, 1966, 1968 Amateurs; 1971, 1976 Opens
 Juli Inkster: 1980, 1981, 1982 Amateurs; 1999, 2002 Opens

Eleven players have won both the U.S. Women's and British Ladies Amateur Championships, through 2021:
 Dorothy Campbell:^ 1909, 1910, 1924 U.S.; 1909, 1911 British
 Gladys Ravenscroft: 1913 U.S.; 1912 British
 Pam Barton:^ 1936 U.S.; 1936, 1939 British
 Babe Zaharias: 1946 U.S.; 1947 British
 Louise Suggs: 1947 U.S.; 1948 British
 Marlene Stewart Streit: 1956 U.S.; 1953 British
 Barbara McIntire: 1959, 1964 U.S.; 1960 British
 Catherine Lacoste:^ 1969 U.S.; 1969 British
 Carol Semple Thompson: 1973 U.S.; 1974 British
 Anne Quast: 1958, 1961, 1963 U.S.; 1980 British
 Kelli Kuehne:^ 1996 U.S.; 1996 British

^ Won both in same year.

Future sites

Saucon Valley Country Club is slated to host in 2038.
Canterbury Golf Club is slated to host in 2039.
Bandon Dunes Golf Resort is also slated to host in 2041.
Oakmont Country Club is slated to host in 2046.
Source

Notes

External links
 Official site
 Complete records at Sportsnetwork

Amateur golf tournaments in the United States
Women's Amateur Golf Championship
Women's golf tournaments in the United States
Recurring sporting events established in 1895
1895 establishments in New York (state)